Bhappi Sonie (31 July 1928 – 5 September 2001) was an Indian film director and producer, in Hindi cinema. He is best known for Shammi Kapoor and Dharmendra hit films, Janwar (1965) and Brahmachari (1968), and also won Filmfare Award for Best Film.

He started his career, assisting Raj Khosla in Milap (1955), C.I.D. (1956) and Solva Saal (1958), before making his directorial debut with Ek Phool Char Kaante starring Sunil Dutt and Waheeda Rehman.

He died on 5 September 2001, while undergoing a heart bypass surgery at Nanavati Hospital, in Mumbai, at the age of 73.

Filmography

References

External links
 

1928 births
2001 deaths
20th-century Indian film directors
Hindi-language film directors
Indian male screenwriters
Hindi film producers
Place of birth missing
20th-century Indian screenwriters
20th-century Indian male writers